Yaralla was an electoral district of the Legislative Assembly in the Australian state of New South Wales. It was created in 1968, named after Yaralla Estate and largely replaced Concord, extending west to the districts of Parramatta and Granville. It also extended to the north of the Parramatta River, absorbing parts of Eastwood, Parramatta and Ryde It was abolished in 1981 with the area south of the river being absorbed by Electoral district of Burwood and the area north of the river by the re-created district of Ryde. The first member was Lerryn Mutton (Liberal) who had previously unsuccessfully contested Concord. The sitting member Garry McIlwaine (Labor) successfully contested Ryde.

Members for Yaralla

Election results

References

Former electoral districts of New South Wales
Constituencies established in 1968
1968 establishments in Australia
Constituencies disestablished in 1981
1981 disestablishments in Australia